Melior Community Academy is a coeducational secondary school with academy status, located in Scunthorpe, North Lincolnshire, England. The school is sponsored by the School Partnership Trust Academies (SPTA).

The school started as Thomas Sumpter School, before amalgamating with South Leys Business & Enterprise College in September 2007 to form Melior Community College. In 2011 the school was rebuilt  as part of the Building Schools for the Future programme. The school was called Melior Community College until January 2013. The school converted to academy status in January 2013 and was renamed Melior Community Academy.

Notable alumni
 Bryan Budd  (16 July 1977 – 20 August 2006) - recipient of the Victoria Cross (Thomas Sumpter School)

References

External links

Secondary schools in the Borough of North Lincolnshire
Academies in the Borough of North Lincolnshire
Schools in Scunthorpe
Delta schools